1966 riots may refer to:

 Hong Kong 1966 riots, April 6–8, Hong Kong
 Division Street riots, June 12–14, Chicago, IL
 Hough riots, July 18–23, Cleveland, OH
 Compton's Cafeteria riot, August, San Francisco, CA
 Benton Harbor riots, August 30–September 5, Benton Harbor, MI
 Sunset Strip curfew riots, November 12, Los Angeles, CA
 12-3 incident, December 3, Macau, China